Gastón Nahuel Roselló Gazo (born 24 August 1997) is a Uruguayan footballer who plays as a defender for Uruguay Montevideo in the Uruguayan Segunda División.

Career
In January 2019, Roselló re-joined Rampla Juniors, after signing with Peñarol in the summer 2018.

References

External links
Gastón Roselló at Footballdatabase

1997 births
Living people
Uruguayan footballers
Association football defenders
Footballers from Montevideo
Rampla Juniors players
Peñarol players
Uruguay Montevideo players
Uruguayan Primera División players
Uruguayan Segunda División players